Paul Furlan (Binche, born 3 November 1962) is a Walloon politician and former Minister of Local Government and City Policy (including Tourism) in the Walloon Government for the Parti Socialiste. Furlan has a degree in public administration obtained at the University of Liège.

In 1999 Furlan was elected for the Walloon Parliament and in 2000 he was mayor of Thuin, an office he still holds.

References

External links

Website at work (Walloon Government)

1962 births
Living people
Government ministers of Wallonia
Socialist Party (Belgium) politicians
Mayors of places in Belgium
Belgian people of Italian descent
University of Liège alumni
People from Binche
21st-century Belgian politicians